Jógvan Sundstein (born 25 May 1933) is a Faroese politician and member of the Faroese People's Party.

Jógvan is the son of Johanna Malena (born Jensen) and Hans Jacob Matras Sundstein from Tórshavn. He is married to Lydia (born Marsten) from Klaksvík.

Jógvan Sundstein is a certified accountant and was a member of numerous boards of directors. In 1979 he was elected to the Løgting for the first time. He was the speaker of the Løgting from 1980 to 1984 and 1988 to 1989. He was Prime Minister of the Faroe Islands (Løgmaður) from 1989 to 1991 and was a minister from 1991 to 1993.    

In 2008 Sundstein published his memoirs, becoming the first Faroese politician to do so.

Johan Sundstein, better known as N0tail, is his grandson.

Works
 Frá barnaárum ungu til lívsins heystartíð. Stiðin 2008

References
 Løgtingið 150 - Hátíðarrit. Tórshavn 2002, Volume 2, p. 351 (PDF-Download)

Notes

1933 births
Living people
Prime Ministers of the Faroe Islands
Finance Ministers of the Faroe Islands
People's Party (Faroe Islands) politicians
Deputy Prime Ministers of the Faroe Islands
Speakers of the Løgting